Henry Kemp-Blair (April 15, 1930 – April 30, 1986)  was a South African-born playwright, director, clergyman and educator that was instrumental in developing the theater program at Chapman University.

Biography

Background
Henry John Kemp-Blair was born April 15, 1930 in South Africa and immigrated to the United States in 1946. He studied theology at Claremont College. Kemp-Blair trained in theater arts at Chapman College, Cal State Long Beach and USC. He became naturalized as a U.S. Citizen in 1975.

Career
In 1960, Kemp-Blair joined the faculty of Chapman where he was instrumental in developing their theatre arts program. Spending over twenty-five years on the faculty, Kemp-Blair wrote, produced and directed a number of plays there. One of his most famous plays is "The Tea Concession," a drama set in South Africa in which the racial positions of black and white are reversed. He staged a production of the play in March 1966 at Chapman.

Death

He died of a heart attack on April 30, 1986. The night before his death, he had been rehearsing for "Dance Is," a dance show that was scheduled to open the day after his death.

Legacy
 The Henry Kemp-Blair Shakespeare Festival at Chapman University is named in his honor. The goal of the festival "is to provide high school students with an opportunity to experience and learn more about performing Shakespeare."

References

External links
 Henry Kemp-Blair Shakespeare Festival

1930 births
1986 deaths
South African dramatists and playwrights
American musical theatre lyricists
South African emigrants to the United States
White South African people
20th-century dramatists and playwrights